Endophthalmitis is inflammation of the interior cavity of the eye, usually caused by infection. It is a possible complication of all intraocular surgeries, particularly cataract surgery, and can result in loss of vision or loss of the eye itself. Infection can be caused by bacteria or fungi, and is classified as exogenous (infection introduced by direct inoculation as in surgery or penetrating trauma), or endogenous (organisms carried by blood vessels to the eye from another site of infection). Other non-infectious causes include toxins, allergic reactions, and retained intraocular foreign bodies. Intravitreal injections are a rare cause, with an incidence rate usually less than .05%.

Signs and symptoms
There is usually a history of recent eye surgery or penetrating trauma to the eye. Symptoms include severe pain, vision loss, and intense redness of the conjunctiva. Hypopyon can be present and should be looked for on examination by a slit lamp. It can first present with the 'black dot sign' (Martin-Farina sign), where patients may report a small area of loss of vision that resembles a black dot or fly.

An eye exam should be considered in systemic candidiasis, as up to 3% of cases of candidal blood infections lead to endophthalmitis.

Complications
 Panophthalmitis — Progression to involve all the coats of the eye.
 Corneal ulcer
 Orbital cellulitis
 Impairment of vision
 Complete loss of vision
 Loss of eye architecture
 Enucleation

Cause
 Bacteria: N. meningitidis, Staphylococcus aureus, S. epidermidis, S. pneumoniae, other streptococcal spp., Cutibacterium acnes, Pseudomonas aeruginosa, other gram negative organisms. 
 Viruses: Herpes simplex virus.
 Fungi: Candida spp. Fusarium
 Parasites: Toxoplasma gondii, Toxocara''.

A recent systematic review found that the most common source of infectious transmission following cataract surgery was attributed to a contaminated intaocular solution (i.e. irrigation solution, viscoelastic, or diluted antibiotic), although there is a large diversity of exogenous microorganisms that can travel via various routes including the operating room environment, phacoemulsifcation machine, surgical instruments, topical anesthetics, intraocular lens, autoclave solution, and cotton wool swabs.

Late-onset endophthalmitis is mostly caused by Cutibacterium acnes.

Causative organisms are not present in all cases. Endophthalmitis can emerge by entirely sterile means, e.g. an allergic reaction to a drug administered intravitreally.

Diagnosis

Diagnosis:
Microbiology testing.
PCR.
TASS vs Infectious endophthalmitis.

Prevention
A Cochrane Review sought to evaluate the effects of perioperative antibiotic prophylaxis for endophthalmitis following cataract surgery. The review showed high-certainty evidence that antibiotic injections in the eye with cefuroxime at the end of surgery lowers the chance of endophthalmitis. Also, the review showed moderate evidence that antibiotic eye drops (levofloxacin or chloramphenicol) with antibiotic injections (cefuroxime or penicillin)  probably lowers the chance of endophthalmitis compared with injections or eye drops alone. Separate studies from the research showed that a periocular injection of penicillin with chloramphenicol-suphadimidine eye drops,  and an intracameral cefuroxime injection with topical levofloxacin resulted in a risk reduction of developing endophthalmitis following cataract surgery for subjects.

In the case of intravitreal injections, however, antibiotics are not effective. Studies have demonstrated no difference between rates of infection with and without antibiotics when intravitreal injections are performed. The only consistent method of antibioprophylaxis in this instance is a solution of povidone-iodine applied pre-injection.

Treatment
The patient needs urgent examination by an ophthalmologist, preferably a vitreoretinal specialist who will usually decide for urgent intervention to provide intravitreal injection of potent antibiotics. Injections of vancomycin (to kill Gram-positive bacteria) and ceftazidime (to kill Gram-negative bacteria) are routine. Even though antibiotics can have negative impacts on the retina in high concentrations, the facts that visual acuity worsens in 65% of endophthalmitis patients and prognosis gets poorer the longer an infection goes untreated make immediate intervention necessary. Endophthalmitis patients may also require an urgent surgery (pars plana vitrectomy), and evisceration may be necessary to remove a severe and intractable infection which could result in a blind and painful eye.

Steroids may be injected intravitreally if the cause is allergic.

In patients with acute endophthalmitis, combined steroid treatment with antibiotics have been found to improve visual outcomes, versus patients only treated with antibiotics, but any improvements on the resolution acute endophthalmitis is unknown.

References

External links 

Eye diseases
Medical emergencies